The Portuguese Albums Chart ranks the best-performing albums in Portugal, as compiled by the Associação Fonográfica Portuguesa.

See also 
 List of number-one singles of 2019 (Portugal)

References 

Number one albums
Portugal
Albums 2019